The Creditsafe Group is a privately owned multinational provider of on-line company credit scores and credit report information. Founded in 1997 the company has expanded and now has operations in 12 countries across Europe, North America & Japan and claims to be the world’s most-used provider of company credit reports. Creditsafe now employs over 1,200 people and has a customer base in excess of 100,000 subscription customers worldwide.

History 

Creditsafe was founded in 1997 in Oslo, Norway with the idea of using the then emerging technology of the internet to supply business information to a market of smaller and medium-sized businesses by selling over the telephone and delivering reports over the internet. Following the Norwegian launch Creditsafe established an office in Gothenburg Sweden in 1998 before moving to the UK in 2000. Creditsafe re-located the UK sales operation to Caerphilly in South Wales in 2002. In 2006 Creditsafe France was launched in Roubaix near Lille. Additional entities were later launched in Dublin in Ireland in 2007, The Hague in the Netherlands in 2008, Berlin, Germany in 2010, Brussels, Belgium in 2011 and Turin in Italy in 2013. Creditsafe moved outside Europe in 2012 with the founding of Creditsafe United States in Allentown, Pennsylvania. Since launching in the USA, Creditsafe have now increased its US workforce by opening a new office in Tempe, Arizona Creditsafe established a shared service centre in Cardiff Bay, Wales in 2006 which has grown to support the sales operations around the world. In September 2016, Creditsafe set up its own operation in Japan. Creditsafe Japan has its offices in Fukuoka and Tokyo

Current Status 

In each country in which it operates Creditsafe has a sales and customer service operation dealing with customers over the telephone and internet. Creditsafe employs over 1,200 people in its 16 offices in 10 countries it currently has just over 200,000 subscription users.

Creditsafe claims to be the world’s most-used provider of on-line company credit reports and estimates it will deliver over 110 million reports during 2016.

Products and services 

Creditsafe’s core business offering is an on-line company credit report based on original source public and private data which is brought together to give information on a company and an assessment of its creditworthiness. Creditsafe provides a credit rating and suggested credit limit in all its reports.

Creditsafe reports are accessed via Creditsafe’s own websites over the internet by most of its customers however increasing large volume customers purchase solutions that either integrate into their own accounting software or use one of Creditsafe’s own integrated services such as Creditsafe 3D.

Creditsafe combines data from all its operating countries in its reports in an attempt to provide full international details on companies that operate in more than one country or who have other international linkages.

References 

 

Risk management companies
Financial services companies established in 1997
Consulting firms established in 1997
Data brokers